Yorkshire was a constituency of the House of Commons of the Parliament of England from 1290, then of the Parliament of Great Britain from 1707 to 1800 and of the Parliament of the United Kingdom from 1801 to 1832. It was represented by two Members of Parliament, traditionally known as Knights of the Shire, until 1826, when the county benefited from the disfranchisement of Grampound by taking an additional two members.

The constituency was split into its three historic ridings, for Parliamentary purposes, under the Reform Act 1832. Each riding returned two MPs. The county was then represented by the Yorkshire East Riding, Yorkshire North Riding and Yorkshire West Riding constituencies.

Boundaries
Yorkshire is the largest of the historic counties of England. The constituency comprised the whole county. Yorkshire contained several boroughs which each independently returned two members to Parliament. These were Aldborough, Beverley, Boroughbridge, Hedon, Kingston upon Hull, Knaresborough, Malton, Northallerton, Pontefract, Richmond, Ripon, Scarborough, Thirsk and York.

Members of Parliament

MPs 1290–1640 
Constituency created 1290

MPs 1640–1826 
Short Parliament
 1640: Sir William Savile, Bt
 1640: Henry Belasyse

Long Parliament
 1640–1648: The Lord Fairfax of Cameron (Parliamentarian) – died March 1648
 1640–1642: Henry Belasyse (Royalist) – disabled to sit, September 1642
(Although writs were issued to fill both these vacancies, no elections seem to have been held and the seats remained vacant to the end of the Parliament)

Barebones Parliament (Nominated members)
 1653: Lord Eure, Walter Strickland, Francis Lascelles, John Anlaby, Thomas Dickenson, Thomas St. Nicholas, Roger Coats, Edward Gill

First Protectorate Parliament (Fourteen members elected for the three Ridings)
 1654–1655: East Riding: Hugh Bethell, Richard Robinson, Walter Strickland, Sir William Strickland; North Riding:  Lord Eure, Francis Lascelles, Thomas Harrison, George Smithson; West Riding: Lord Fairfax, John Lambert, Henry Tempest, John Bright, Edward Gill, Martin Lister

Second Protectorate Parliament (Fourteen members elected for the three Ridings)
 1656–1658: East Riding: Hugh Bethell, Richard Darley, Henry Darley, Sir William Strickland; North Riding:  Lord Eure, Francis Lascelles, Major General Robert Lilburne, Luke Robinson; West Riding: John Lambert, Colonel Henry Tempest, Edward Gill, Francis Thorpe, Henry Arthington, John Stanhope

Third Protectorate Parliament
 1659: The Lord Fairfax of Cameron, Thomas Harrison

Long Parliament (restored)
Both seats vacant

MPs 1826–1832Notes'Elections
The county franchise, from 1430, was held by the owners of freehold land valued at 40 shillings or more. Each voter had as many votes as there were seats to be filled. Votes had to be cast by a spoken declaration, in public, at the hustings, which took place in the county town of York. The expense and difficulty of voting at only one location in the (very large) county, together with the lack of a secret ballot contributed to the corruption and intimidation of voters, which was widespread in the unreformed British political system.

The expense, to candidates, of contested elections encouraged the leading families of the county to agree on the candidates to be returned unopposed whenever possible. Contested county elections were therefore unusual.

Elections in the eighteenth century
Only two elections in the 18th century were contested.

At the 1784 general election, the seat was initially contested, but the two Whig candidates Francis Ferrand Foljambe and William Weddell conceded without calling for a poll.

Elections in the 1800s
At the 1802 general election, William Wilberforce and Henry Lascelles were elected unopposed.

At the 1806 general election, William Wilberforce and Walter Ramsden Fawkes were elected unopposed.

Elections in the 1810s and 1820s
At the 1812 general election, Viscount Milton and Henry Lascelles were elected unopposed.

At the 1818 and 1820 general elections, Viscount Milton and James Stuart Wortley were elected unopposed.

At the 1826 general election, Richard Fountayne Wilson, John Marshall, William Duncombe and Viscount Milton were elected unopposed.

Elections in the 1830s

At the 1831 general election, George Strickland, John Charles Ramsden, John Vanden-Bempde-Johnstone and George Howard were elected unopposed.

See also
 1807 Yorkshire election
List of former United Kingdom Parliament constituencies
Unreformed House of Commons

 References 
 The Parliaments of England by Henry Stooks Smith (1st edition published in three volumes 1844–50), second edition edited (in one volume) by F.W.S. Craig (Political Reference Publications 1973) originally published in 1844–50, so out of copyright''

Parliamentary constituencies in Yorkshire and the Humber (historic)
Constituencies of the Parliament of the United Kingdom established in 1290
Constituencies of the Parliament of the United Kingdom disestablished in 1832